The Yakovlev VVP-6 was an experimental design for a flying support and surface-to-air missile platform, capable of vertical takeoff and landing. It never progressed beyond the model stage.

Development
Perhaps the most radical design ever to emerge from the Yakovlev OKB studio, the VVP-6 appeared more science fiction than a craft likely to have seen production. The VVP-6 was designed as a giant VTOL support platform which would work in coordination with VTOL jets, such as Yakovlev's Yak-38.

Among the many functions envisioned for this line of vehicles was the transportation of food, fuel and munitions. The huge, box-like design was to have been 49m long. In one version it was capable of carrying a complete SAM missile system, including six SA-2 (ASCC name "Guideline") missiles with launchers mounted on the craft's upper surface. Reloads and supporting radars were to be stored internally.

The VVP-6 was to have been fitted with six six-blade rotors mounted on six pylons extending from the craft's sides. Each rotor was to have been driven by four turboshaft engines, giving the VVP-6 a total of 24 engines.

The requirement for such a craft ended when the Soviet Air Force failed to put land-based VTOL jets into service.

See also
Yakovlev Yak-60
Mil V-12

References

 Gunston, Bill. Yakovlev Aircraft since 1924. London, UK: Putnam Aeronautical Books, 1997. .

Abandoned military aircraft projects of the Soviet Union
Military helicopters
Multirotor helicopters
Yak VVP-6